The medial umbilical ligament (or cord of umbilical artery, or obliterated umbilical artery) is a paired structure found in human anatomy. It is on the deep surface of the anterior abdominal wall, and is covered by the medial umbilical folds (plicae umbilicales mediales). It is different from the median umbilical ligament, a structure that represents the remnant of the embryonic urachus.

Origins
It represents the remnant of the umbilical arteries, which serves no purpose in humans after birth, except for the initial part that becomes the adult superior vesical artery.
The occluded part of umbilical artery becomes the medial umbilical ligament postnatal.

The medial umbilical ligament arises from the anterior division of the internal iliac artery.

Functions
It may be used as a landmark for surgeons performing laparoscopic procedures to help identify and avoid damaging the inferior epigastric arteries during port placement. Other than this, it has no purpose in an adult and it may be cut or damaged with impunity

Relations
The supravesical fossa, and therefore a supravesical hernia, is medial to this structure. The medial inguinal fossa, and therefore a direct inguinal hernia, is lateral to it.

See also
 median umbilical ligament (originating from urachus)
 lateral umbilical ligament
 Umbilical fascia

External links
 Medial umbilical ligament
  - "The inguinal canal and derivation of the layers of the spermatic cord."
 
 
 Medial umbilical fold
  - "Internal surface of the anterior abdominal wall."

Additional images

Abdomen
Ligaments